The Gopher Way is a system of discontinuous tunnels and skyways on the University of Minnesota, Twin Cities campus which connects many buildings. The system is open during the normal business hours of the buildings it occupies, while some portions are open 24 hours a day. Access policies are posted at the entrances of connected buildings. It is one of three skyway/tunnel systems in the Twin Cities area. The other two occupy both downtown Minneapolis and downtown St. Paul.

The system is segmented into eight parts: the West Bank; the Knoll and Mall areas; the Health and Gateway areas; and five smaller segments on the St. Paul campus. Parking structures are also connected to the Gopher Way. It is entirely possible for one to park, attend classes, eat lunch, and drive home without setting foot outdoors, but given the discontinuous nature of it, few people actually do.

References

Underground cities
University of Minnesota
Buildings and structures in Minneapolis
Buildings and structures in Ramsey County, Minnesota
Skyways